Kingston is a village in DeKalb County, Illinois, United States. The population was 1,108 at the 2020 census, down from 1,164 at the 2010 census.

History 
Settled in 1835 by the Pottawatomie Indians, Kingston was one of the first townships in DeKalb County. The post office was established in 1837 with Levi Lee as postmaster.

The village of Kingston was founded in 1875 when the Chicago & Pacific railroad laid tracks through the township and built a depot on section 22 on a farm belonging to Lyman Stuart, an early settler of Kingston township. Lyman and his brother, James Stuart paid to have the Pleasant Hill church moved to the new site from its original location on Baseline road south of the new village. The Stuart brothers had the village platted in May 1876. The first major fire in the village occurred in January 1886 when several frame buildings were engulfed on the east side of Main street. A farmer, John Uplinger agreed to build a block of brick on the burned site if the citizens would vote to incorporate. An election was held in May 1886 with a question of incorporation on the ballot which resulted in a vote of 69 for incorporation and 17 against. A lumber yard was established by Lyman Stuart in 1876 which Mr. Uplinger purchased from the Stuart estate in 1882. Mr. Uplinger operated the lumber yard until his death in 1892 when control was assumed by his son, B. F. "Frank" Uplinger. The son built a grain elevator in 1892 and in addition to dealing in lumber and grain, he also sold coal & salt. Frank continued this line until 1921 when he sold to the newly formed Kingston Farmers Cooperative. Frank's brother, John H. Uplinger operated a hardware store and sold farm implements and also served as postmaster. Another brother, Charles Uplinger operated the meat market. The citizens voted for a public school house in 1879 which was opened in 1881 and was destroyed by fire in 1895. The second school opened in 1895 and it too was destroyed by fire in 1954. Telephone service came to Kingston in 1898. Indoor plumbing in 1910 and the village was wired for electricity in 1913.

With Kingston being a major "hub" for two railroads business flourished throughout the area. By the 1900s Kingston had many businesses including; a hardware store, department store, grocery, meat market, paint shop, hotel, bank, bakery, shoe store, barber shop, pool room, saloon, general store, creamery, undertaking parlor, saw mill, coal and lumber yard, two blacksmith shops, two livery barns, stock yards and two confectionaries. Kingston even had its own baseball team, The Kingston Tigers. Some of the businesses mentioned above were destroyed in the fire of 1908, which engulfed a large part of town on the west side of Main Street.

W. H. Bell, an early resident of Kingston, instigated the first Kingston Picnic while he was Village President. The picnic was held every year and in 1912, when The Kingston Township Park opened, the picnic had a permanent home. The annual Kingston Picnic was held for over 100 years and celebrated its centennial in 1976.

Geography

Demographics
As of the 2020 census there were 1,108 people, 400 households, and 301 families residing in the village. The racial makeup of the village was 85.47% White, 0.81% African American, 0.45% Native American, 0.18% Asian, 4.33% from other races, and 8.75% from two or more races. Hispanic or Latino of any race were 10.92% of the population.

There were 400 households, out of which 54.00% had children under the age of 18 living with them, 61.75% were married couples living together, 6.50% had a female householder with no husband present, and 24.75% were non-families. 20.00% of all households were made up of individuals, and 2.25% had someone living alone who was 65 years of age or older. The average household size was 3.37 and the average family size was 2.94.

The village's age distribution consisted of 25.7% under the age of 18, 11.1% from 18 to 24, 25% from 25 to 44, 25.7% from 45 to 64, and 12.5% who were 65 years of age or older. The median age was 37.3 years. For every 100 females, there were 95.5 males. For every 100 females age 18 and over, there were 103.5 males.

The median income for a household in the village was $84,375, and the median income for a family was $92,228. Males had a median income of $46,696 versus $26,821 for females. The per capita income for the village was $30,270. About 5.6% of families and 5.8% of the population were below the poverty line, including 8.9% of those under age 18 and 6.1% of those age 65 or over.

Education
Kingston is served by the Genoa-Kingston Community Unit School District with nearby Genoa. The district has four public schools: Genoa Elementary School (Grades 3-5; Genoa), Kingston Elementary School] (Grades K-2; Kingston), Genoa-Kingston Middle School (Grades 6-8), and Genoa-Kingston High School (Grades 9-12). The GK School District's team name is the Cogs, an acronym created from the phrase "Community of Genoa Schools" that also evokes a feeling of teamwork not unlike the cogs in a machine, however some local history states that it stands for "Consolidation of Genoa Schools".

References

External links
Village of Kingston-Official Website
History of Kingston, Illinois

Villages in DeKalb County, Illinois
Villages in Illinois
Populated places established in 1835
1835 establishments in Illinois